Cansu Yağ (born 22 June 1990) is a Turkish women's football midfielder, who last played in the Turkish Women's First Football League for Bornova Hitab Spor in İzmir. She was admitted to the Turkey women's national football team in 2006 after playing for the national U-15, U-17 and U-19 teams.

Early life 
Cansu Yağ was born on 22 June 1990 in Mönchengladbach to Turkish parents living in Germany. Her father, a professional football player in Turkey, who continued his sports career also in Germany, took Cansu to football matches since she was two years old. At the age of six, her father registered her in the club he played. The first seven years, Cansu played football in mixed-gender teams. In the first 13 years of her career, she was with four clubs. In Germany, she played in the Fußball-Regionalliga der Frauen, and was lately in the squad of FSC Mönchengladbach.

Club caeer 

After graduating from Gymnasium Rheindahlen in Mönchengladbach, she moved to Turkey to attend university. There, she enrolled in the Trakya University in Edirne to study physical education and sports. She played for Trabzonspor until its closure, and then became a member of the women's football club Lüleburgaz 39 Spor in October 2011, which was promoted to the Turkish Women's First Football League. In August 2012, Yağ was transferred by Konak Belediyespor.

At FSC Mönchengladbach, she helped to her team's success by scoring goals many times. Yağ continued scoring at Lüleburgaz 39 Spor, and Konak Belediyespor as well. In the 2012–13 season, at which she scored three goals in total, she experienced the Turkish league championship. Playing in the 2013–14 UEFA Women's Champions League, her team completed the qualifying round as group leader, and passed the Round of 32, failed however to reach the quarterfinals by losing the two matches in the Round of 16 against the Austrian side SV Neulengbach.

At the end of the 2015–16 season, she enjoyed her team's champion title. She played in three matches of the Group 9 of the 2016–17 UEFA Women's Champions League qualifying round.

At the end of the 2017–18  First League season, she ended her career last played at Konak Belediyespor. However, she played in the play-off matches for the 2022–23 Third League season for Bornova Hitab Spor, where she scored one goal in two matches.

International career 

Already at the age of 14 and still living in Germany, she was selected to the Turkey girls' U-15 national team, and travelled for this reason to Turkey to take part at the training camps and international matches. After playing in the national U-17 and U-19 teams, she was admitted to the Turkish women's national team in 2006. She had preferred to play for the Turkey national rather than for the German. Cansu Yağ played at the 2008 UEFA Women's U-19 Championship First qualifying round matches against the teams from Poland, Austria and Bulgaria, scoring a goal in the last match. In the UEFA Women's Euro 2009 qualifying match against Georgia, she shot one of the nine goals. Yağ scored two goals against Malta and one goal against Austria in the 2011 FIFA Women's World Cup qualification – UEFA Group 5 matches in April 2010.

Career statistics 
.

Honours 
 Turkish Women's First Football League
 Konak Belediyespor
 Winners (5): 2012–13, 2013–14, 2014–15, 2015–16, 2016–17
 Third places (1): 2017–18

References

External links 
 

Living people
1990 births
Sportspeople from Mönchengladbach
German people of Turkish descent
German women's footballers
Turkish women's footballers
Konak Belediyespor players
Women's association football midfielders
Trakya University alumni
Turkey women's international footballers
Lüleburgaz 39 Spor players
Trabzonspor women's players
Footballers from North Rhine-Westphalia